The Miss South Carolina Teen competition is the pageant that selects the representative for the U.S. state of South Carolina in the Miss America's Outstanding Teen pageant. Miss South Carolina Teen pageant is held the same week as Miss South Carolina, usually occurring during the last weekend in June at the Township Auditorium in Columbia, South Carolina.

Miss South Carolina Teen title does not include the term, "Outstanding," due to Little Miss South Carolina's copyright of the term.

Piper Holt of Fountain Inn was crowned Miss South Carolina Teen on June 25, 2022 at the Township Auditorium in Columbia, South Carolina. She competed for the title of Miss America's Outstanding Teen 2023 at the Hyatt Regency Dallas in Dallas, Texas on August 12, 2022 where she was 2nd runner-up for the National Fundraiser Award.

Results summary
The following is a visual summary of the past results of Miss South Carolina Teen titleholders presented in the table below. The year in parentheses indicates year of the Miss America's Outstanding Teen competition in which the placement and/or award was garnered.

Placements
 Miss America's Outstanding Teen: Taylor Fitch (2009), Rachel Wyatt (2013)
 Top 9: Berkley Bryant (2019)
 Top 10: Maggie Hill (2007), Ali Rogers (2010), Sarah Hamrick (2016), Kellan Finnegan (2020)
Top 11: Dabria Aguilar (2022)
 Top 15: Lindley Mayer (2006)

Awards

Preliminary awards 
 Preliminary Evening Wear/On-Stage Question: Sarah Hamrick (2016)
 Preliminary Talent: Maggie Hill (2007)

Other awards 
 Children's Miracle Network (CMN) Miracle Maker Award: Berkley Bryant (2019)
 National Fundraiser 2nd Runner-up: Piper Holt (2023)
 Outstanding Achievement in Academic Life: Brook Sill (2014)
 Scholastic Excellence Award: Sarah Hamrick (2016), Makayla Stark (2017), Kellan Fenegan (2020)
 Teens in Action Award Finalists: Kellan Fenegan (2020)
Top Advertisement Sales: Dabria Aguilar (2022) (tie)
Top Dance Talent Award: Dabria Aguilar (2022)

Winners

References

External links
  Official website

South Carolina
South Carolina culture
Women in South Carolina
Annual events in South Carolina